Gerolamo Sauli (died 1559) was a Roman Catholic prelate who served as Archbishop of Bari-Canosa (1540–1550) 
and Archbishop of Genoa (1550–1559).

Biography
On 20 August 1540, Gerolamo Sauli was appointed during the papacy of Pope Paul III as Archbishop of Bari-Canosa.
On 18 April 1550, he was appointed during the papacy of Pope Julius III as Archbishop of Genoa.
He served as Archbishop of Genoa until his death in Rome in 1559.

References

External links and additional sources
 (for Chronology of Bishops) 
 (for Chronology of Bishops) 
 (for Chronology of Bishops) 
 (for Chronology of Bishops) 

16th-century Italian Roman Catholic bishops
Bishops appointed by Pope Paul III
Bishops appointed by Pope Julius III
1550 deaths
Roman Catholic archbishops of Genoa